Gunnera macrophylla, is a species of Gunnera found in Papuasia, Indonesia, and the Philippines.

References

External links
 
 

macrophylla